Bala Şamlıq is a village in the municipality of Qəribli in the Tovuz Rayon of Azerbaijan.

References

Populated places in Tovuz District